Otgonbaataryn Sergelen (born January 9, 1989) is a Mongolian professional basketball player. He currently plays for the SBL Khasyn Khuleguud Becks club of the Mongolian National Basketball Association (MNBA).

He went to the Mongolian Railway College in Ulaanbaatar.  

Sergelen Otgonbaatar represented Mongolia's national basketball team at multiple occasions such as the 2011 East Asian Basketball Championships in China. Later, he represented Mongolia at the 2012 Asian Beach Games, also in China, where he led Mongolia to the bronze medal, the country’s first basketball medal in history. 
At the 2014 Asian Games in South Korea, he was Mongolia’s best passer as he averaged 2.8 assists per game.

References

External links
 Real GM profile
 Asia-basket.com profile

1989 births
Living people
Point guards
Mongolian men's basketball players
People from Ulaanbaatar
Basketball players at the 2014 Asian Games
Basketball players at the 2018 Asian Games
Asian Games competitors for Mongolia
21st-century Mongolian people